Puthiya Vaarpugal is a 1979 Indian Tamil-language romantic drama film co-written, produced and directed by Bharathiraja. The film stars K. Bhagyaraj and Rati Agnihotri, with G. Srinivasan, Goundamani, K. K. Soundar and Usharani in supporting roles. It revolves around a school teacher who falls in love with a woman in his village, their relationship is threatened by the village head.

Puthiya Vaarpugal is the acting debut of Agnihotri, and also marked the first film for Bhagyaraj as a lead actor. The film was released on 14 April 1979, and won two Tamil Nadu State Film Awards: Second Best Film and  Best Dialogue Writer (Bhagyaraj). It was remade in Telugu as Kotha Jeevithalu (1981) by the same director.

Plot 
Shanmugamani comes to a village as a school teacher. Around the same time, another woman comes there as a social activist. Both work hard to establish themselves. They meet occasionally and exchange pleasantries and books as they are educated, and share common interests. Shanmugamani meets Jothi, daughter of the village temple musician and they fall in love with each other. The village chief is a lecherous man. His stooge Amavasai is keen to marry Jothi, but Jothi's father is not interested in the proposal. When the chief sees Jothi, he lusts for her. Knowing about her love for Shanmugamani, he orders her to yield to his lust and threatens to fire Shanmugamani if she refuses. Jothi slaps him and the chief awaits an opportunity to take revenge. Meanwhile, Shanmugamani approaches Jothi's father with his marriage proposal, and he accepts. Enraged with this development, the chief plots revenge.

When the social activist visits the chief, he rapes and murders her, framing Shanmugamani. The chief alleges that the two had an illicit relationship; when she became pregnant, Shanmugamani killed her. The other villagers believe this and insult Shanmugamani. Though Jothi does not believe this, Shanmugamani leaves the village, leaving a note to Jothi that he would return to take her with him. When Jothi's father and brother are away, he makes Amavasai enter her house without her knowledge. When she is asleep, he knocks on her door along with other villagers. An unaware Jothi opens and says there is no one in her house until Amavasai emerges; the chief alleges an illicit relationship between Amavasai and Jothi, and orders their wedding as a solution. Though aware of the chief's plan, Jothi helplessly marries Amavasai, and her father dies shortly thereafter. Shanmugamani returns to take Jothi and learns about the wedding.

When Amavasai is eager to celebrate his wedding night, the chief orders him to leave as he himself wants Jothi. Amavasai pleads to spare his wife, to no avail. When the chief approaches Jothi, she willingly comes to him and they hug, only for Jothi to stab the chief to death, just as Shanmugamani and Amavasai arrive. Amavasai feels guilty for cheating and marrying her, so he removes the mangala sutra he tied and asks her to live happily with Shanmugamani. Amavasai hides the chief's corpse in a hay meant for torching during a festival and villagers burn it, oblivious to the corpse. Shamugamani and Jothi leave the village.

Cast 
K. Bhagyaraj as Shanmugamani
Rati Agnihotri as Jothi
G. Srinivasan as the village chief
Goundamani as Amavasai
K. K. Soundar as Jothi's father
Usharani as the social activist
Manobala as a Panchayat member
Janagaraj as the landlord's son
Chandrasekhar as the prospective groom
Master Haja Sheriff as Doraisamy

Production 
The title Puthiya Vaarpugal was derived from the short story of the same name by Jayakanthan. It is the film debut of the then 16-year-old Rati Agnihotri; Bharathiraja decided on her as the lead actress after watching her performance in a school play. Agnihotri's father agreed to let her join the film after Bharathiraja promised to complete filming within a month. Bharathiraja said he chose Agnihotri because he wanted a woman who looked like a "sunflower in their midst". It is also the first film for K. Bhagyaraj as lead actor. Gangai Amaran was originally considered, but Bharathiraja later decided on Bhagyaraj. According to Bharathiraja, he was not cast until the day before filming. K. K. Soundar and G. Srinivasan were initially cast as the village chief and the female lead's father respectively, but switched their roles. The song "Vaan Megangale" was filmed at Kumbakkarai Falls. Filming was completed in 22 working days. Amaran dubbed Bhagyaraj's voice as he was unavailable for dubbing sessions due to having to attend his mother's funeral.

Soundtrack 

The music was composed by Ilaiyaraaja, with lyrics by Kannadasan, Gangai Amaran and Muthulingam. The song "Vaan Megangale" is set to the Carnatic raga Sankarabharanam, "Idhayam Poguthe" is set to Keeravani, and "Thamthananam Thana" is set to Shanmukhapriya.

Release and reception 
Puthiya Vaarpugal was released on 14 April 1979, during Puthandu. Ananda Vikatan rated the film 59 out of 100, saying the director presented the film without deviating from the path chosen and with intelligence and fineness. The film was a success, and won two Tamil Nadu State Film Awards: Second Best Film, and Best Dialogue Writer (Bhagyaraj).

References

Bibliography

External links 
 

1970s Tamil-language films
1979 films
1979 romantic drama films
Films about rape in India
Films directed by Bharathiraja
Films scored by Ilaiyaraaja
Indian romantic drama films
Tamil films remade in other languages